King Abdulaziz City for Science and Technology (KACST) in Riyadh, Saudi Arabia is an organization established in 1977 as the Saudi Arabian National Center for Science & Technology (SANCST); in 1985, it was renamed King Abdulaziz City for Science and Technology.

History
In 1977, the Saudi Arabian National Center for Science and Technology (SANCST) was established, with Prof. Rida M.S. Obaid being the president. This center was created as an independent scientific organization that is responsible for the promotion of science and technology in Saudi Arabia. However, the name was later changed to King Abdulaziz City for Science and Technology (KACST). In 1987, KACST has joined the International Council for Science (ICSU) as a National Member.

In 1984, Abdul Rahman Al-Athel was named as the President of the city. In 2007, Mohammed Ibrahim Al-Suwaiyel, who used to be the KACST vice president for research, became the president. HH Dr. Turki Al Saud is the KACST vice president.

Organization

Institutes
The research complex is divided into the following research institutes:

Atomic Energy Research Institute
Computer and Electronics Research Institute
Petroleum and Petrochemical Institute
Energy Research Institute
Resource and Development Institute
Astronomy and Geophysics Institute
Space Research Institute

Centers
KACST has many different research centers, including:

GIS Innovation Center
National Center for Nano Technology Research
The National Robotics and Intelligent Systems Center
The National Center for Water Research
The National Center of Mathematics & Physics
Technology Development Center
The National Center for Astronomy
The National Center for Biotechnology
The National Center for Agricultural Technologies
The National Centre Environmental Technology
The National Center for Radiation Protection
The National Center for Radioactive Waste Management
Center of Excellence for Wireless Applications - CEWA (Working with Intel)
Center of Excellence for Software Development (Working with IBM)
Saudi Lunar and Near-Earth Object Science Center (Working with NASA)
Center of Excellence for Space and Aeronautics (Working with Stanford University)
Center of Excellence for Wildlife Research (Working with the Saudi Wildlife Authority)
Center of Excellence for Nanotechnology (Working with IBM)
Center of Excellence for Nanotechnology Manufacturing (Working with Intel)
Center of Excellence for Green Nanotechnology (Working with UCLA)
Center of Excellence for Bionanotechnology (Working with Northwestern University)
Center of Excellence for Nanomedicines (Working with UCSD)
Center for Excellence in Biomedicine (Working with Brigham and Women's Hospital)
Media Center
Middle East Center for Energy Efficiency (Working with Intel)
Joint Center for Genomics (Working with Chinese Academy of Sciences)
Advanced Sensors & Electronics Defense (ASED) Center
Center for Complex Engineering System - CCES (Working with MIT)

Programs
KACST is now working in the following programs:

National Satellite Technology Program
National ECP Program
National Program for Advanced Materials and Building Systems
National Program for Automobile Technology
Aviation Technology National Program

Projects

The National Science, Technology and Innovation Plan
The National Science, Technology and Innovation Plan (NSTIP) is a collaboration between the King Abdulaziz City for Science and Technology and the Ministry of Economy and Planning. This program was approved by the Council of Ministers in 2002. This program has fifteen strategic technologies that will help the future development of Saudi Arabia.

These plans are: Water, Oil and Gas, Petrochemicals Technology, Nanotechnologies, Biotechnology, Information Technology, ECP (Electronics, Communications, Photonics), Space and Aeronautics Technology, Energy, Advanced Materials, Environment, Mathematics and Physics, Medical and Health, Agricultural Technology, Building and Construction

King Abdullah's Initiative for Arabic Content
 is a project that aims to provide high-quality Arabic contents in all disciplines. To achieve this goal, KACST started to work with the local and international organizations. For example:
Nature Arabic Edition: KACST has collaborated with the Macmillan Publishers to translate Nature journal into Arabic. The print issues are freely available to qualified subscribers. Also, the contents of this journal will be available online for free.
Wiki Arabi: This is another project initiated by King Abdullah's Initiative for Arabic Content. This project aims to improve the content of the Arabic Wikipedia by translating the high-quality articles from other languages of Wikipedia such as English, French and Hebrew Wikipedia. The first Wiki Arabi event was in 2010, where over 2000 articles were translated into Arabic. The second Wiki Arabi was in 2012.

Nuclear technology

In 1988, KACST starts planning to develop nuclear technology in Saudi Arabia. Therefore, KACST decided to open the Atomic Energy Research Institute (AERI). This Institute will help Saudi Arabia to develop the nuclear power along with King Abdullah City for Atomic and Renewable Energy. The AERI has four different departments: Radiation Protection Department, Industrial Applications, Nuclear Reactors and Safety, and a Materials Department

Scientific achievements
 KACST's Space Research Institute has designed some satellites that are used in scientific purposes. Such as: SaudiSat 5A,5B, SaudiComSat-1, SaudiGeo-1 and the Geostationary Satellite SGS-1 ( 1/Hellas Sat 4) and Arabsat-6A which was recently launched on 4 February 2019.
 In 2006, KACST signed a collaboration agreement with CERN to participate in the construction of LINAC4 project. KACST engineers constructed a warm prototype of it. This prototype was then qualified at CERN. And now, KACST is working build up a high-energy physics community to participate in future CERN programs.
 On September 30, 2008, KACST funded the science team of Gravity Probe B, helping them to complete the project.
 In 2012, KACST announced the first electrostatic accelerator in Saudi Arabia. This accelerator has been designed by the National Center of Mathematics and Physics.
 In April 2013, KACST announced the creation of WaferCatalyst, which is a Multi-project Wafer (MPW) consolidation initiative, which aims to promote Integrated circuit design and related technologies in Saudi Arabia and surrounding regions.

Information Technology Unit (ITU)
Information Technology requirements for research center and city staff is fulfilled by the ITU section situated in building No. 1.

Internet proxy for Saudi Arabia
The King Abdulaziz City for Science and Technology operates the Internet backbone in Saudi Arabia as well as the local registry address space. According to RIPE, "all Saudi Arabia web traffic will come from [the] IP block" registered to KACST.

Board Membership
 Ahmed Alsuwaiyan (March 2017 – December 2019).

See also
 Communication in Saudi Arabia
 Censorship in Saudi Arabia
 List of things named after Saudi Kings

References

External links
 
The National Science, Technology and Innovation Plan website 
King Abdullah's Initiative for Arabic Content 
KACST high resolution logo (text in black)
KACST high resolution logo (text in white)
GIS Innovation Center 

1977 establishments in Saudi Arabia
Government agencies established in 1977
Science and technology in Saudi Arabia
Scientific organisations based in Saudi Arabia
Government agencies of Saudi Arabia
Organisations based in Riyadh
Members of the International Council for Science
Members of the International Science Council
Censorship in Saudi Arabia